Nostalgia is a sentimentality for the past.

Nostalgia may also refer to:

Film and television
 Nostalghia, a 1983 Russian film by Andrei Tarkovsky
 Nostalgia (1971 film), stylised as (nostalgia), an avant-garde film by Hollis Frampton
 Nostalgia (2018 film), an American film
 Nostalgia (2022 film), an Italian film
 Nostalgia (TV series), 2018 ABS-CBN Filipino drama series

Music
 Adult standards, a radio format (also sometimes known as the nostalgia format)
 Nostalgia Night (la Noche de la Nostalgia), a celebration of musical oldies in Uruguay
 Nostalghia (musician), American singer and songwriter

Classical compositions
Nostalghia, for violin & string orchestra Toru Takemitsu
"Nostalgia", for flute & guitar by David Leisner
Nostalgia, for piano by Tigran Mansurian

Albums
 Nostalgia (The Jazztet album), 1988
 Nostalgia (Ivan Kral album), 1995
 Nostalgia (Annie Lennox album), 2014
 Nostalgia, a 2004 album by July for Kings
 Nostalgia, a 1983 album by Milly Quezada
 Nostalgia, an EP by Fat Tulips
 Nostalgia, a 2015 EP by Chase Atlantic
 Nostalgia (Victon EP), 2019
 Nostalgia (Tresor album), 2019

Songs
"Nostalgia" (Blanco song), a 2022 song by Blanco
"Nostalgia", a 2008 song by Emily Barker and The Red Clay Halo
"Nostalgija", the Croatian entry in the 1995 Eurovision Song Contest
"Nostalgia", a song by Epica from the album Requiem for the Indifferent
"Nostalgia", a song by Pentagon from the 2020 EP WE:TH
"Nostalgia", a 2009 song by Megumi Nakajima
"Nostalgia", a 1985 song by The Chameleons
"Nostalgia", a 1975 song by Francis Goya
"Nostalgia", a 1978 song by Buzzcocks
"Nostalgia", a song in Yanni's Keys to Imagination (1986) and other albums
"Nostalgia", a song by Gorguts from the 1998 album Obscura

Other media
 Nostalgia (novel), a 1993 novel by Mircea Cărtărescu
 Nostalgia (sculpture), in Puerto Vallarta, Jalisco
 Nostalgia (video game), a 2008 Japanese role-playing game for Nintendo DS
 Nostalgia, a 2017 rhythm game by Bemani

See also 
 Nostalgia Night, a national celebration of Uruguay, observed on August 24 each year
 Nostalgia Critic, a persona used by Doug Walker on the website Channel Awesome
 Nostalgic (disambiguation)